Sharon Lenore Anderson is a Canadian country music singer.  During the late 1980s, Anderson was a member of country group Trinity Lane, who charted three singles on Billboard Hot Country Singles chart in 1988. In 1991, she signed to Capitol Nashville and released her solo debut album, The Bottom Line, the same year. The album produced two singles that charted on the RPM Country Tracks chart in Canada. Another album, Bringing It Home, was released on Royalty Records in 1995.

As a songwriter, Anderson co-wrote fellow Canadian country singer Lisa Brokop's 1994 Top 20 single "Give Me a Ring Sometime". Anderson recorded her own version, as "Gimme a Ring Sometime", on her 1995 album.

Discography

Albums

Singles

See also

Music of Canada
List of Canadian musicians

References 
Citations

Bibliography

External links
Sharon Anderson  website
 Sharon Anderson Official website

Year of birth missing (living people)
Living people
Place of birth missing (living people)
Canadian women country singers
Musicians from Edmonton
Capitol Records artists